Batshugar Enkhbayar (born 19 May 1987) is a Mongolian banker and politician. Enkhbayar is a member of the State Great Khural, representing the Songino Khairkhan constituency since 2021. He is a member of the Mongolian People's Party.

Biography 
Enkhbayar was born on 19 May 1987 in Ulaanbaatar, Mongolia. His father is Nambaryn Enkhbayar, the former president of Mongolia. Enkhbayar attended high school in California, and later graduated from Bentley University in 2008 with a Bachelor's degree in finance and economics. From 2008 until 2011, Enkhbayar worked as an investment banker at JPMorgan Chase.

In 2012, following the arrest of Enkhbayar's father on corruption charges, a move seen by American officials as democratic backsliding, both Enkhbayars were barred from running in the 2012 Mongolian legislative election. Later in 2012, Enkhbayar became the deputy governor of the Bank of Mongolia, serving in that role until 2016. He then became a member of the board of directors of Mediaholding LLC, holding that role until 2021.

In 2020, Dolgorsürengiin Sumyaabazar resigned from the State Great Khural following his appointment as mayor of Ulaanbaatar. Enkhbayar successfully ran to replace Sumyaabazar, winning the October 2021 special election with 51% of the vote.

References 

1987 births
Living people
People from Ulaanbaatar

Bentley University alumni
Members of the State Great Khural
Mongolian bankers
JPMorgan Chase employees
Mongolian economists
Governors of Bank of Mongolia
Mongolian People's Party politicians
21st-century Mongolian politicians